Basipodellidae is a family of crustaceans belonging to the order Hexanauplia.

Genera:
 Basipodella Becker, 1975
 Hypertantulus Ohtsuka & Boxshall, 1998
 Nipponotantulus Huys, Ohtsuka & Boxshall, 1994
 Polynyapodella Huys, Møbjerg & Kristensen, 1997
 Rimitantulus Huys & Conroy-Dalton, 1997
 Serratotantulus Savchenko & Kolbasov, 2009
 Stygotantulus Boxshall & Huys, 1989

References

Crustaceans
Crustacean families